Alrewas is a civil parish in the district of Lichfield, Staffordshire, England.  It contains 51 listed buildings that are recorded in the National Heritage List for England.  Of these, one is at Grade I, the highest of the three grades, and the others are at Grade II, the lowest grade.  The parish contains the village of Alrewas, the smaller settlement of Orgreave, and the surrounding area.  Most of the listed buildings are in the village of Alrewas, most of these are houses and cottages, and a high proportion of them are timber framed or have timber-framed cores.  The Trent and Mersey Canal and the River Trent pass through the parish, and a bridge crossing the canal is listed.  The other listed buildings include a church, memorials in the churchyard, a small country house and its stable block, farmhouses and farm buildings, a public house, two mileposts, and a war memorial.


Key

Buildings

References

Citations

Sources

Lists of listed buildings in Staffordshire